Parvez Amin (born 5 September 2000) is an Afghan cricketer. He made his first-class debut for Kabul Province in the 2018–19 Mirwais Nika Provincial 3-Day tournament on 15 February 2019. He was the leading wicket-taker in the tournament, with 24 dismissals in five matches. He made his Twenty20 debut for Amo Sharks in the 2019 Shpageeza Cricket League on 11 October 2019.

References

External links
 

2000 births
Living people
Afghan cricketers